Bishop Alexander Burnet (1615–1684) was a Scottish clergyman.

Life

Born in the summer of 1615 to James Burnet and Christian née Dundas, he gained an MA from the University of Edinburgh in 1633. He chose to follow the career of his father, who had been minister of Lauder, by becoming a churchman himself. He entered the service of his mother's kinsman the Earl of Traquair, becoming the personal chaplain of John Stewart, 1st Earl of Traquair.

This was the springboard for a high-level ecclesiastical career. He was presented to Coldingham in 1639 by King Charles I, but could not retain this position because of the National Covenant. Burnet went to exile in England, where he became a strong Royalist, something which forced him to flee to continental Europe. He returned to Great Britain after the Restoration of the monarchy, becoming rector of a parish church in Kent (Ivychurch) and chaplain to Andrew Rutherford, governor of Dunkirk.

The Restoration of the monarchy was followed by the restoration of Episcopacy in Scotland. Burnet became Bishop of Aberdeen in 1663. He held this position for less than a year, receiving promotion as the successor of Andrew Fairfoul to the Archbishopric of Glasgow. As Archbishop, he took a hard line on ecclesiastical non-conformity, and led the attempts to repress the Pentland Rising of 1666. His continued hard-line attitude, even after reconciliation became general policy, and his enmity against the Earl of Lauderdale, made him a controversial figure. He became too much of a liability for the King, who pressured him to resign as Archbishop. This he did on 24 December 1669.

Burnet went into England again. His high ecclesiastical career was revived in 1679, becoming Archbishop of St Andrews. He held this position until his death by illness on 22 August 1684. He was buried in St Salvator's Chapel.

References
 Mullan, David George, "Burnet, Alexander (1615–1684)", in the Oxford Dictionary of National Biography, Oxford University Press, 2004 , retrieved 29 April 2007

1615 births
1684 deaths
Alumni of the University of Edinburgh
Roman Catholic archbishops of Glasgow
Archbishops of St Andrews
Bishops of Aberdeen
Chancellors of the University of Glasgow
Chancellors of the University of St Andrews
Scottish Restoration bishops
Members of the Parliament of Scotland 1661–1663
Members of the Convention of the Estates of Scotland 1667
Members of the Parliament of Scotland 1669–1674
Members of the Convention of the Estates of Scotland 1678
Members of the Parliament of Scotland 1681–1682
Extraordinary Lords of Session